The 2013 Holiday Bowl was an American college football bowl game that was played on December 30, 2013, at Qualcomm Stadium in San Diego, California.  The 36th edition of the Holiday Bowl, it featured  the Texas Tech Red Raiders of the Big 12 Conference and the Arizona State Sun Devils of the Pac-12 Conference.  It was one of the 2013–14 bowl games that concluded the 2013 FBS football season.  The game started at 7:15 p.m. PST and was telecast on ESPN.  It was sponsored by National University and was officially known as the National University Holiday Bowl.  Texas Tech defeated Arizona State by a score of 37–23.

This was only the second meeting of the teams. Although both the Red Raiders and Sun Devils were members of the Border Conference from 1932–1956, neither team faced the other until the 1999 season when both universities were members of their current athletic conferences. The Red Raiders lost to the Sun Devils 13–31, in both teams' season opener at Sun Devil Stadium in Tempe, Arizona.

Teams

Arizona State 

The Arizona State Sun Devils won the South Division Championship of the Pac-12 Conference after they defeated the UCLA Bruins on November 23, 2013. However, they lost the Pac-12 Championship Game to the Stanford Cardinal 38–14. Earlier in the season, the Sun Devils lost to the Cardinal 28–42, and the Notre Dame Fighting Irish 34–37.

Texas Tech 

The Texas Tech Red Raiders won their first seven games this season, but lost their last five games, including the last game to Texas Longhorns, 16–41. Texas Tech, along with Arkansas, Auburn, Baylor, Missouri, Oklahoma, Oklahoma State, and Stanford, are the only teams to face four ranked opponents in AP Poll in the teams' final six games.

Game summary

Scoring summary

Statistics

References 

Holiday Bowl
Holiday Bowl
Arizona State Sun Devils football bowl games
Texas Tech Red Raiders football bowl games
Holiday Bowl
December 2013 sports events in the United States